Hemierana is a genus of beetle in the family Cerambycidae, from North America. It contains two described species:

Hemierana marginata (Fabricius, 1798)
Hemierana rileyi Heffern et al., 2019

References

Hemilophini